The men's super heavyweight (+91 kilograms) event at the 2014 Asian Games took place from 26 September to 3 October 2014 at Seonhak Gymnasium, Incheon, South Korea.

Like all Asian Games boxing events, the competition was a straight single-elimination tournament. All bouts consisted of three three-minute rounds. 

A total of 9 men from 9 countries competed in this event, super heavyweight division, limited to fighters whose body weight was more than 91 kilograms.

Ivan Dychko of Kazakhstan won the gold medal after beating Jasem Delavari from Iran in the final bout.

Schedule
All times are Korea Standard Time (UTC+09:00)

Results 
Legend
KO — Won by knockout

References

Results

External links
Official website

Boxing at the 2014 Asian Games